The six martyred ministers or Sayuksin were six ministers of the Joseon Dynasty who were executed by King Sejo in 1456 for plotting to assassinate him and restore the former king Danjong to the throne.  

The Six were Seong Sam-mun, Pak Paeng-nyeon, Ha Wi-ji, Yi Gae, Yu Eung-bu, and Yu Seong-won. Most were members of the Hall of Worthies, a royal research institute, who had been appointed by King Sejong. Both King Sejong and King Munjong had charged them with looking after King Danjong (son and grandson respectively), and they reacted with outrage to Sejo's usurpation of the throne in 1455. Together with Kim Jil, they plotted a coup to coincide with the visit of a Ming Dynasty envoy. When the banquet and subsequently the assassination plot were postponed, Kim Jil lost his heart and betrayed the plot to his father-in-law, who reported to Sejo. The Six except Yu Seong-won, who committed suicide with his wife, were seized and tortured. 

Sejo felt deeply betrayed for he had valued the six scholar-officials very highly and promoted them to high positions in favor of his own supporters who helped him take the throne.  He tried to force them to repent their deeds and acknowledge his legitimacy with combination of torture, offers of pardon, and even poetry. He sent Kim Jil to their cells to recite a poem that King Taejong of Joseon had used to test the great Goryeo scholar Jeong Mongju's loyalty to the Goryeo dynasty. Seong Sam-mun, Pak Paeng-nyeon, and Yi Gae all answered with poems that reaffirmed their loyalty to Danjong. (These famous death poems cemented their reputation in Korean history.)  

When Pak continued to refuse to address Sejo with royal title, Sejo argued that it was meaningless to deny his legitimacy now since Pak had already called himself a "royal servant" and received royal grains from him. Pak, however, denied this and it was indeed discovered that Pak had purposefully misspelled words "royal servant" (he wrote the word meaning "huge" (巨) instead of "royal servant" 臣) in all of his reports and never used royal grains but instead put them unused in a storage. Pak died from torture in prison, and the rest were executed. 

Although the Six were the most famous, more than 70 were put to death for their suspected involvement in the plot or sympathy with Danjong. As was common with treason cases, the penalties were not limited to the individual but extended to the entire family. The men of the family were put to death and the women were made slaves.  

There were also many officials who were not involved in the plot but had retreated to rural provinces in protest to Sejo's usurpation.  Six of the most famous men among them, including Kim Si-seup, were called "Six living ministers" (생육신).   

After the Sarim faction came to dominate Joseon politics, national opinion came to revere the Six martyred ministers as model subjects, and numerous shrines and seowon were erected in their memory. This attitude continued in the 20th century, with philosopher Ham Seok-heon praising their conduct and saying that "The shame of the five centuries of Yi Korea were more than offset by this event."

In pop culture 
The story of the Six is also often dramatized in literature and TV series, the latest being a historical drama produced in North Korea. This show, which was the first North Korean drama to be aired in the South, was broadcast in South Korea in August 2007.

Notes

See also
Politics in the Joseon Dynasty
History of Korea
List of Koreans

External links
Chapter from The Queen of Suffering, by Ham Seok-heon
Dusan encyclopedia entry, in Korean

15th-century Korean people
1456 deaths